Blue Bus was a large independent bus company serving Greater Manchester, Lancashire and Merseyside.

History

Blue Bus was formed in 1991 by former Shearings managers Roger Jarvis and Alan Turner. It was based at a former railway works in Horwich, six miles to the west of Bolton. The first type of bus to be acquired in bulk was the Leyland Leopard, which were followed by a number of Leyland Atlanteans.

It commenced operating its first route in May 1991 between Bolton and Horwich via Chorley New Road in competition with GM Buses. Each of the five services introduced to give this combined frequency served a different estate in Horwich. A 20-minute service along Chorley Old Road from Bolton to the Johnson Fold estate was next to be introduced, followed by a series of routes in Wigan. The first of these ran to Shevington. It was decided to open an outpost at Appley Bridge to act as a local base for the Wigan routes.

New routes were added to the network following contract wins, and a number of commercial routes were also introduced, taking the company into new areas such as Manchester. In addition, the company gained work from a holiday company, Alfa Tours. Five coaches were acquired for this, with two were specially branded for Alfa.

Blue Bus purchased a depot in Huddersfield in August 1994, launching a service to Marsden in competition with Yorkshire Rider. This venture was later expanded into Bradford. Rider was taken over by FirstBus in 1996, and Blue Bus' West Yorkshire operation ceased. Just weeks later, FirstBus took over Blue Bus's main Bolton rival, GM Buses North.

During 2001, after Stagecoach sold the East Lancashire end of Ribble Motor Services company to Blazefield, Blue Bus started intensive competition against newly formed Lancashire United in the Bolton area. Blue Bus took over operation of the Bolton end of Lancashire United in August 2002, acquiring the former Ribble depot, staff, services and several vehicles. The head office was moved to the former Lancashire United office at Bolton bus station, and the Horwich base was later closed down, with most buses moving to Bolton. This acquisition saw rivalry develop between Blue Bus and FirstBus, with Blue Bus moving onto the 400 TransLancs Express service and introducing an X9 express service into Manchester. Both companies eventually withdrew and the services were withdrawn.

In early 2005, Blue Bus sold its Appley Bridge depot to South Lancs Travel along with six buses and all of the depot's routes. This allowed the company to focus on its depots in Bolton and Eccles, with a proposal to expand further having gained tenders in Salford and Manchester on eight routes.

On 31 July 2005, Blue Bus was acquired by Arriva North West & Wales.

Services operated

Blue Bus operated numerous bus services, including the following:

6: Bolton - Little Hulton - Walkden - Swinton - Manchester

6A: Bolton - Little Hulton - Walkden - Swinton - Manchester

7: Bolton - Little Hulton - Walkden - Swinton - Manchester

9: Bolton - Horwich - Blackrod

25: Bolton - Farnworth - Walkden - Swinton - Weaste - Manchester

36A: Bolton - Little Hulton - Walkden - Swinton - Manchester

55: Pendleton - Westwood Park - Eccles

61: Eccles - Westwood Park (circular)

62: Eccles - Westwood Park (circular)

63: Brookhouse - Eccles - Manchester

64: Eccles - Brookhouse - Westwood Park (circular)

65: Eccles - Brookhouse - Westwood Park (circular)

69: Eccles - Westwood Park - Pendleton - Stretford

70: Clifton - Swinton - Eccles - Pendleton - Manchester

70: Hope Hospital - Eccles - Swinton - Clifton

71: Clifton - Swinton - Weaste - Pendleton - Manchester

73: Clifton - Swinton - Weaste - Pendleton - Manchester

74: Pendleton - Agecroft (circular)

75: Pendleton - Agecroft (circular)

99: Sale - Northenden - Southern Cemetery - Manchester

111: Preston - Penwortham - Leyland - Eccleston - Standish - Wigan

113: Preston Hospital - Preston - Leyland - Standish - Wigan

116: Wigan - Standish - Charnock Richard - Leyland - Preston - Faringdon Park* [* Saturdays only]

126: Bolton - Horwich - Lever Park

127: Blackrod - Westhoughton - Deane - Bolton

200: Bolton - Atherton - Leigh - Golborne - Ashton - Haydock - St Helens

243: Bolton - Ramsbottom - Rawtenstall

273: Bolton - Ramsbottom - Rawtenstall

290: Manchester - Trafford Park - Trafford Centre - Flixton - Partington

291: Manchester - Trafford Park - Trafford Centre - Flixton

293: Eccles - Trafford Park (circular)

400: Bolton - Bury - Rochdale - Oldham - Ashton - Stockport

478: Bolton - Breightmet - Radcliffe - Bury

484: Hope Hospital - Eccles - Swinton - Pendlebury - Agecroft - Prestwich

502: Bolton - Barrow Bridge

505: Bolton - Markland Hill

505: Bolton - Markland Hill - Middlebrook

505: Bolton - Markland Hill - Middlebrook - Horwich (Pennine Road)

508: Bury - Tottington - Hawkshaw - Tonge Moor - Bolton

510: Bolton - Withins - Bury

511: Bury - Ainsworth - Radcliffe

515: Bolton - Ladybridge (circular)

515: Bolton - Ladybridge - Middlebrook - Aspull - Wigan

516: Horwich - Horwich Parkway Station

516: Horwich - Westhoughton - Atherton - Leigh - (Trafford Centre, as 673)

517: Horwich - Middlebrook - Horwich Parkway Station

520: Bolton - Willows - Hulton Hospital - Morris Green

521: Bolton Hospital - Westhoughton - Wingates - Blackrod

523: Bolton - Bury

525: Bolton - Halliwell - Astley Bridge - Hall i'th' Wood - Bolton (circular)

526: Bolton - Halliwell - Smithills

527: Bolton - Hall i'th' Wood - Astley Bridge - Halliwell - Bolton (circular)

528: Bolton - Astley Bridge - Belmont

529: Bolton - Astley Bridge - Eagley

534: Bolton - Asltey Bridge - Oldhams Estate

535: Bolton - Asltey Bridge - Belmont - Blackburn* [* Sundays only]

538: Bolton - Astley Bridge - Andrew Lane

538: Bolton - Astley Bridge - Bank Top - Dunscar - Bromley Cross - Bolton

539: Andrew Lane - Astley Bridge - Bolton

539: Bolton - Bromley Cross - Dunscar - Bank Top - Astley Bridge - Bolton

540: Bolton - Westhoughton - Daisy Hill

544: Bolton - Darcy Lever - Little Lever (circular)

545: Bolton - Harwood

547: Bolton - Westhoughton - Daisy Hill (circular)

548: Bolton - Westhoughton - Daisy Hill (circular)

550: Farnworth - New Bury - Walkden (circular)

554: Bolton - Farnworth - Walkden - Peel Green - Eccles - Trafford Centre* [* Non-Schooldays]

556: Bolton - Farnworth - Walkden - Peel Green - Eccles - Trafford Centre [Sundays only]

557: Prestolee - Farnworth - Highfield

563: Bolton - Bromley Cross - Edgworth

570: Bolton - Lever Edge - Morris Green

572: Bolton - Lever Edge (circular)

573: Trafford Centre - Worsley - Little Hulton - Bolton - Lostock - Horwich - Blackrod - Aspull - Wigan

573: Coppull - Standish - Horwich - Bolton

575: Bolton - Lostock - Horwich - Blackrod - Aspull - Wigan

575: Bolton - Lostock - Horwich - Blackrod - Aspull - Wigan - Bolton Hospital

576: Horwich - Middlebrook

576: Bolton - Middlebrook - Horwich - Blackrod - Aspull - Wigan

577: Bolton - Lostock - Brazley - Horwich (Pennine Road)

581: Atherton - Bolton Hospital - Farnworth

605: Ashton Heath - Ashton-in-Makerfield - Bryn (circular)

607: Ashton Heath - Ashton-in-Makerfield - Bryn - Marus Bridge - Wigan

609: Leyland Park - Hindley - Pennington Green - Aspull - Wigan

611: Wigan - Shevington - Wrightington Hospital (circular)

612: Wigan - Shevington - Wrightington Hospital (circular)

613: Wigan - Orrell - Kitt Green - Shevington - Wrightington Hospital - Standish

613: Wigan - Orrell - Kitt Green - Shevington - Standish

614: Wigan - New Springs (circular)

615: Wigan - Aspull

616: Shevington - Standish - Middlebrook - Westhoughton

616: Bolton - Lostock - Horwich - Blackrod - Aspull - Wigan

620: Bolton - Hag Fold - Atherton - Hindley - Ashton - Haydock - St Helens

621: Haworth Road - Bradford Interchange - Bierley

622: Wigan - Kitt Green

622: Kitt Green - Wigan - Platt Bridge - Leigh - Astley - Worsley - Trafford Centre

624: Wigan - Kitt Green (circular)

627: Wigan - Pemberton - Kitt Green - Shevington - Wigan (circular)

629: Wigan - Platt Bridge - Hindley - Castle Hill

633: Wigan - Worsley Mesnes - Windy Arbour - Pemberton - Kitt Green

634: Wigan - Shevington - Standish - Wigan (circular)

635: Wigan - Shevington - Standish - Wigan (circular)

637: Wigan - Shevington - Kitt Green - Pemberton - Wigan (circular)

637: Wigan - Shevington - Kitt Green

640: Standish - Boars Head - Wigan

641: Standish - Red Rock - Boars Head - Wigan

642: Wigan - Bradley Mills

643: Wigan - Standish - Shevington - Wigan (circular)

651: Atherton - Hindley - Ashton-in-Makerfield

673: Leigh - Astley - Boothstown - Worsley - Trafford Centre

700: Trafford Centre - Bolton - Ladybridge - Westhoughton - Wigan - Aspull - Wigan

715: Bolton - Ladybridge - Westhoughton - Wigan - Aspull - Wigan

M9: Manchester - Farnworth - Worsley - Peel Green - Eccles - Pendleton - Lower Broughton - Manchester

M10: Brookhouse - Peel Green - Eccles -Hope Hospital - Pendleton - Lower Broughton - Manchester

M70: Clifton - Swinton - Eccles - Pendleton - Manchester

X1: Little Lever - Walkden - Atherton - Wigan - Blackpool - Fleetwood

X9: Bolton - Lostock - Blackrod

X9: Bolton - Farnworth - Manchester

X11: Doffcocker - Bolton - Westhoughton - Wigan - Blackpool - Fleetwood

X14: Pendleton - Walkden - Wigan - Blackpool - Fleetwood

Vehicle types

Blue Bus had a wide variety of buses in its fleet, including the following:[3]

Single-deck buses

Dennis Dart / Alexander Dash

Dennis Dart / East Lancs EL2000

Dennis Javelin / Duple 300

Dennis Lance / Alexander PS

Leyland Leopard / Alexander AT

Leyland Leopard / Alexander AY

Leyland Leopard / Alexander AYS

Leyland Leopard / Duple Dominant Bus

Leyland Leopard / Duple Dominant IV

Leyland Leopard / East Lancs EL2000 (rebody)

Leyland Leopard / Marshall BET

Leyland Leopard / Pennine

Leyland Leopard / Plaxton Derwent

Leyland Leopard / Willowbrook BET

Leyland Leopard / Willowbrook 003

Leyland Leopard / Willowbrook Warrior

Leyland National (integral)

Leyland Tiger / Duple Dominant Bus

Leyland Tiger / Duple 300

Leyland Tiger / East Lancs EL2000 (rebody)

Volvo B10M-56 / Plaxton Derwent 3000

Volvo B10M-61 / Duple Dominant Bus

Volvo B58-56 / East Lancs EL2000 (rebody)

Double-deck buses

DAF DB250 / Northern Counties Palatine II

Leyland Atlantean / Alexander AL

Leyland Atlantean / East Lancs

Leyland Atlantean / Park Royal

Leyland Olympian / Alexander RL

Leyland Olympian (integral)

Volvo B10M Citybus / Alexander RV

Volvo Olympian / East Lancs Pyoneer

Low-floor buses (known as "Blue Buggy Buses")

DAF SB120 / Wright Cadet

DAF SB220 / East Lancs Myllennium

DAF SB220 / Ikarus 481

DAF SB220 / Ikarus Polaris 489

DAF SB220 / Plaxton Prestige

Dennis Dart SLF / Alexander ALX200

Dennis Dart SLF / Plaxton Pointer

Dennis Dart SLF / Plaxton Pointer II

Dennis Trident 2 / Plaxton President

MAN 14.220 / East Lancs Myllennium

MAN 18.220 / Alexander ALX300

Volvo B10BLE / Wright Renown

Minibuses

Dodge S56 / Alexander AM

Dodge S56 / Northern Counties

Mercedes-Benz 709D / Plaxton Beaver

Mercedes-Benz O814D / Plaxton Beaver II

Mercedes-Benz L608D / Rootes

Optare Metrorider Mk II (integral)

Optare Metrorider Mk III (integral)

Coaches

DAF SB3000 / Plaxton Premiere 320

DAF SB3000 / Van Hool Alizee

Leyland Tiger / Plaxton Paramount III 3200

References

External links
Flickr gallery

Companies based in Bolton
1991 establishments in England
2005 disestablishments in England
Former bus operators in Greater Manchester
Former bus operators in Lancashire
Former bus operators in Merseyside
Former bus operators in West Yorkshire